WagJag is a discount product website based in Toronto, Canada. The company was founded in late 2009 and is owned by  Emerge Commerce, which was founded by Ghassan Halazon and others. Emerge acquired WagJag from Metroland Media, a subsidiary of Torstar Corporation in November 2017. Emerge is also the owner of Shop.ca, Buytopia.ca, and Shop.us.

Business model 
Just as any other online deals websites such as Groupon and LivingSocial, WagJag  has a very similar premise, with a focus on the Canadian market. WagJag is a group discount website which is focused on providing large discounts to its customers and providing registered companies with a handful of new customers if they choose to participate.

Like any business model there is a step by step formula that must be followed to ensure the business makes money. How WagJag works is ...
 A company signs up with WagJag
 WagJag takes the product/service and offers a discounted price
 Once a certain number of people sign up for the discount, the discount is officially given to those customers

WagJag makes its money is through the transactions of the people buying the discounted vouchers.  For instance, if WagJag offers a discounted product/service for $50, WagJag would keep a percentage and the remaining percentage would go to the company. The company does not make much profit from this transaction however WagJag has essentially created a demand for that particular product. By only offering a limited number of discounts the remaining handful of customers are now curious about the product which has now given the company great marketing value as those who were unable to obtain the initial discount are now forced to pay full price.

Competitors 
"Deal a day" sites are extremely popular and widespread online, from the famous Groupon to the unique multiple deals of Wagjag. Both these "deal a day" sites compete against one another as customers visiting these sites do not need to pay for their advertising until their services or products are purchased. In this case, both Groupon and Wagjag have their upfront cost virtually advertised. For WagJag, the cost of a daily campaign to a merchant is a percentage of each of their customer purchases. One to two deals are given out daily to every specific area.

The reason why Groupon is Wagjag's top competitor is because Groupon accommodates over 140 cities worldwide and offers deals in more cities than any other 'deal a day' site. Hence, their company is big and well-known. Their technique of providing discount for a customer is as follows: a discount daily is presented for a niche market item (such as spa, restaurant, etc.).

WagJag also has a feature that breaks down urban areas into smaller areas, such as Port Perry and Oakville. This appeals to customers because a customer who purchases a deal would not want to travel too far to indulge on a great deal. Hence, in comparison with Groupon, the diversity of deals are better.

Criticism 
Customer service seems to attend the Facebook page on a regular basis, and there isn't a day where multiple people haven't posted.  Despite the glowing remarks on its Facebook, WagJag has found itself getting many customer service complaints.

Several blogs and comments had been made saying that the customer service for WagJag was terrible.  Customers complaints often included long waiting periods for response, difficulty receiving refunds, and featured businesses that would close down (although this is also experienced by Groupon). In an interview with TechVibes in December 2010, CEO Jeremy Zuker responded:

"We take this very seriously, and it's disheartening to see some of these [complaints]. At the same time, I know how many transactions we process. And I also know that 99.99 per cent of those are flawless and we get lots of people writing in to us saying how much they love the service and how easy it was."

Since then, complaints surrounding WagJag's customer service have diminished and more blogs and comments have reported WagJag's improvement in response times and refund requests. In the same TechVibes article that hosted a series of WagJag complaints, one poster commented:

"Just as an FYI since I hit this thread when searching google, I had an issue recently where I purchased cleaning services from Wagjag, 5 vouchers at $30 a pop, and the service provider kept giving me excuses and cancelled on me four times, most of the time with only 30 minutes notice. I contact Wagjag and within 48 hours they responded and within another 48 hours I had my $150 back on my CC. So looks like their CS is improving."<ref>WagJag.com looks to leverage social media and save you money - Techvibes.com

See also
 Coupons
 Vouchers

References

External links
Official Website

Sales promotion
Online retailers of Canada
Marketing companies of Canada
Internet properties established in 2010
Deal of the day services